The Cima di Gana Bianca is a mountain of the Swiss Lepontine Alps, overlooking Acquarossa in the canton of Ticino. It lies west of the Rheinwaldhorn, between the main Blenio valley and the Val Malvaglia.

References

External links
 Cima di Gana Bianca on Hikr

Mountains of the Alps
Mountains of Switzerland
Mountains of Ticino
Lepontine Alps